Li Chaoyi (1934 – 11 August 2018) was a Chinese neurobiologist. He was an academician of the Chinese Academy of Sciences and was a member of the Communist Party of China.

Biography
Li was born in Chongqing in 1934. He graduated from China Medical University and Fudan University.

Li was a visiting scientist at Max Planck Institute for Biophysical Chemistry, Princeton University, KU Leuven, McGill University, Kyushu Institute of Technology, and Centre national de la recherche scientifique. He was a part-time professor at Fudan University, University of Science and Technology of China, Huazhong University of Science and Technology, Jinan University and the Third Military Medical University.

In 1999 he was elected a member of the council of International Brain Research Organization (IBRO).

On August 11, 2018, Li died of illness in Shanghai.

Papers

Awards
 1991 Second Prize in Natural Science, Chinese Academy of Sciences
 1997 Second Prize in State Natural Science Award
 2000 Science and Technology Award of the Ho Leung Ho Lee Foundation

References

1934 births
2018 deaths
Biologists from Chongqing
China Medical University (PRC) alumni
Chinese neuroscientists
Fudan University alumni
Members of the Chinese Academy of Sciences
Politicians from Chongqing